In mathematical analysis, the mean value theorem for divided differences generalizes the mean value theorem to higher derivatives.

Statement of the theorem 

For any n + 1 pairwise distinct points x0, ..., xn in the domain of an n-times differentiable function f there exists an interior point

 

where the nth derivative of f equals n ! times the nth divided difference at these points:

 

For n = 1, that is two function points, one obtains the simple mean value theorem.

Proof 

Let  be the Lagrange interpolation polynomial for f at x0, ..., xn.

Then  has  zeros: x0, ..., xn.
This means that

 ,

Applications 
The theorem can be used to generalise the Stolarsky mean to more than two variables.

References 

Finite differences